Robert Hodgins (27 June 1920 – 15 March 2010) was an English painter and printmaker.

Life history
Robert Hodgins was born in Dulwich, London, on 27 June 1920, and immigrated to South Africa in 1938. He enlisted with the Union Defence Force in 1940, and served in Kenya and Egypt.

In 1944 he returned to England, and studied art and education at Goldsmiths College, University of London, where he received an arts and crafts certificate in 1951 and a National Diploma of Design in painting in 1953.

He returned to South Africa, where he taught at the Pretoria Technical College School of Art from 1954. From 1962 he was a journalist and critic for Newscheck magazine. He lectured in painting at the University of the Witwatersrand, Johannesburg, from 1966 to 1983.

Hodgins worked using a variety of paint media, including oils, acrylic paint and tempera. he had been exhibiting since the 1950s but did not come to wider attention until the early 1980s. In 1980 and 1981 he had produced a series of paintings based on Ubu, the main character in the play Ubu Roi, who became a recurring subject of his art.

In 1983, he retired to paint full-time. He partook in many solo and group exhibitions in South Africa and abroad. His work can be seen in many galleries, corporate and public collections, including Anglo American, the Johannesburg Art Gallery, the Sandton Art Gallery, the Pretoria Art Museum, the South African National Gallery in Cape Town, University of South Africa (UNISA), the University of the Witwatersrand Art Galleries, and the William Humphreys Art Gallery in Kimberley.

Robert Hodgins died on 15 March 2010, in Johannesburg, after a bout with lung cancer at the age of 89.

Solo exhibitions
 Lidchi Gallery, Johannesburg: 1956, 1958, 1960
 South African Association of the Arts, Pretoria: 1959
 Retrospective, Standard Bank National Arts Festival, Grahamstown: 1986 
 Goodman Gallery, Johannesburg: 1987, 1990, 1992, 1995, 1998, 2000

References

External links
Robert Hodgins's biography
Robert Hodgins's Curriculum Vitae
ArtPrintSA

20th-century English painters
English male painters
21st-century English painters
English printmakers
British expatriates in South Africa
1920 births
2010 deaths
Deaths from lung cancer
Alumni of Goldsmiths, University of London
People from Dulwich
20th-century British printmakers
20th-century English male artists
21st-century English male artists